Pakistan participated in the 10th Asian Games in Seoul, South Korea from  September 20, to October 5, 1986.

References

Nations at the 1986 Asian Games
1986
Asian Games